The United Front of Ethiopian Federalist and Confederalist Forces (UFEFCF) is a coalition of six Ethiopian rebel groups, including the Tigray People's Liberation Front (TPLF) before 2022 and the Oromo Liberation Army (OLA), created in November 2021 during the Tigray War.

Creation

TDF–OLA alliance
In August 2021, Tigray People's Liberation Front (TPLF) leader Debretsion Gebremichael and spokesperson Getachew Reda stated that the Tigray Defense Forces was in negotiations with the Oromo Liberation Army (OLA) to cooperate in fighting against the Ethiopian National Defense Forces (ENDF). OLA spokesperson Odaa Tarbii stated that the two groups "share[d] intel and coordinate[d] strategy", and that the motivation for cooperation was "mutual understanding that Abiy's dictatorship must be removed".

Nine-group alliance
By late October 2021, negotiations had extended to several smaller rebel groups. On 5 November 2021, the alliance was announced to be composed of the following nine groups:
 Afar Revolutionary Democratic Unity Front;
 Agaw Democratic Movement;
 Benishangul People's Liberation Movement;
 Gambella Peoples Liberation Army;
 Global Kimant People Right and Justice Movement/Kimant Democratic Party;
 Oromo Liberation Army;
 Sidama National Liberation Front; 
 Somali State Resistance; and
 Tigray People's Liberation Front.
The alliance was named the United Front of Ethiopian Federalist and Confederalist Forces.

On 31 January 2022 the ARDUF announced that it was distancing itself from the United Front of Ethiopian Federalist and Confederalist Forces after accusing Tigrayan forces of killing civilians in the Afar region.

On 19 October 2022, the BPLM signed a peace agreement with the regional government and left the coalition.

During the Ethiopia–Tigray peace agreement, the TPLF agreed to "Refrain from aiding and abetting, supporting, or collaborating with any armed or subversive group in any part of the country."

On 22 December 2022, over 300 members of the Kimant Democratic Party were arrested by Amhara regional authorities after their leaders facilitated a talk with the government in which they discussed the peaceful surrender of the group and the participation of its members in the integration training provided by the government.

Aims
The alliance stated that its aim was to "dismantle Abiy's government by force or by negotiations, and then form a transitional authority."

Reactions
Gedion Timotheos, the Ethiopian Minister of Justice, called the 5 November announcement of the nine-group alliance a "publicity stunt" and claimed that some of the participating groups were "not really organisations that have any traction".

References

2021 establishments in Ethiopia
Ethiopian civil conflict (2018–present)
Federalism in Ethiopia
Federalist organizations
Military units and formations established in 2021
Political party alliances in Ethiopia
Rebel groups in Ethiopia